Dennis Ibrahim (born 24 December 1974) is a German former professional footballer who played as a forward.

Career
Born in Hamburg, Germany, Ibrahim began playing football in the youth system of Werder Bremen, before turning professional with Fortuna Düsseldorf, making a handful of substitute's appearances in the Bundesliga and 2. Bundesliga. After a spell with Alemannia Aachen in the Regionalliga, Ibrahim made some further appearances in the 2. Bundesliga with Fortuna Köln. He finished his career playing abroad in New Zealand, Austria and Portugal, making two appearances in the Primeira Liga with Estrela da Amadora.

Spotted by then Football Kingz coach Wynton Rufer during his days with Werder Bremen, Ibrahim transferred to Football Kingz FC on a one-year deal in 2000, leaving in 2001 with 12 goals to his name.

Following retirement
Ibrahim participated in a charity game organized by German rapper 2schneidig in 2014 to help give donations for penurious children in Brazil.

Personal life
Ibrahim was born in Germany, and is of Nigerian descent.

References

External links 
 

Living people
1974 births
German sportspeople of Nigerian descent
German footballers
Association football forwards
Bundesliga players
A-League Men players
Austrian Football Bundesliga players
Primeira Liga players
Fortuna Düsseldorf players
Alemannia Aachen players
SC Fortuna Köln players
Football Kingz F.C. players
FC Admira Wacker Mödling players
C.F. Estrela da Amadora players
Footballers from Hamburg
German expatriate footballers
German expatriate sportspeople in New Zealand
Expatriate association footballers in New Zealand
German expatriate sportspeople in Portugal
Expatriate footballers in Portugal
German expatriate sportspeople in Austria
Expatriate footballers in Austria
West German footballers